The 1928 United States presidential election in Mississippi took place on November 6, 1928, as part of the wider United States presidential election. Voters chose 10 representatives, or electors, to the Electoral College, who voted for president and vice president.

Mississippi voted for the Democratic nominee, Governor Alfred E. Smith of New York, over the Republican nominee, Secretary of Commerce Herbert Hoover of California. Smith ran with Senator Joseph Taylor Robinson of Arkansas, while Hoover's running mate was Senate Majority Leader Charles Curtis of Kansas.

Smith won Mississippi by a margin of 82.10%. It was Smith's second strongest state after South Carolina. 

This was the first election since 1888 that a Republican won any county in Mississippi, and the first time since 1892 where a county in the state would vote for a candidate who was not a Democrat. This would also be the last election where a Republican candidate won any counties (i.e. Pearl River, Stone County, George County) in Mississippi until the 1952 election.

Results

References

Notes

Mississippi
1928
1928 Mississippi elections